KSTY (104.5 FM) is a country music formatted radio station licensed to Canon City, Colorado. The station is owned by Royal Gorge Broadcasting, LLC. The signal is rebroadcast by KSTY-FM1, a 3-watt booster station also on 104.5, serving the Colorado Springs area.

History

KSTY went on the air June 1, 1975 as KRLN-FM, changing to KSTX within a year of signing on. It was the FM sister to KRLN, and initially simulcast the AM station. KRLN-FM broadcast with 3,000 watts from a transmitter site in Canon City.
On May 31, 1982, KSTX reverted to the KRLN-FM call letters. It became KSTY on December 30, 1994, with its current country format.
On December 8, 2005, KSTY and KKCS 101.9 FM switched frequencies. The swap was undone in 2007, when the KSTY call letters and "Star Country" moniker returned to the 104.5 frequency.

References

External links
Star Country 104.5 Facebook

Country radio stations in the United States
STY
Radio stations established in 2005